Guava Island is a 2019 American musical film directed by Hiro Murai (his feature directorial debut) with a screenplay by Stephen Glover from a story by Donald Glover, Stephen Glover, Ibra Ake, Jamal Olori and Fam Udeorji. It stars Donald Glover and Rihanna in the lead roles of Deni and Kofi, respectively, and was first exhibited at the Coachella Festival on April 11, 2019. It was then released on April 13, 2019, by Amazon Studios through Amazon Prime Video for anyone to watch without a subscription for 18 hours before being available to Prime subscribers only. In the final hour of the 18 hours, the film was streamed on the Coachella YouTube page and Twitch. Donald Glover was co-headlining at the event as Childish Gambino.

Plot
An animated folk tale narrated by Kofi Novia (Rihanna) introduces the origins of Guava Island and the music played by Deni Maroon (Donald Glover), a local celebrity who lives with Kofi. She wakes up to Deni playing a tune on his guitar. He rushes out of their house and is greeted by many passersby on the street on his way to work; Deni is holding a music festival that the whole town is looking forward to. He is mugged by a group of kids he knows and he convinces them not to rob him by promising them seats up front at the festival.

Kofi works in a factory as a seamstress with Yara while Deni works for Red Cargo, owned by a despotic business magnate named Red who employs most of the people on the island. While at work, an employee details what he would do if he were able to emigrate to America, which Deni dismisses as ignorant ("This Is America"). Deni is kidnapped and taken to Red's office. Red bribes Deni into canceling his festival so that it will not interrupt productivity the next day. When Deni questions his power, Red destroys his guitar.

He returns to Kofi, who asks him about his injury and his guitar's absence. Deni brushes off her inquiry, instead serenading her with the song he had promised to write since they were children ("Summertime Magic"). Deni suddenly has to go. Later at work, Kofi tells Yara that she is reluctant to tell Deni that she is pregnant because of his free-spirited lifestyle.

Inspired by two children, Zoila and Mapi ("Time"), Deni performs on the radio again and announces that he will be at the festival ("Feels Like Summer"). Kofi is ambushed by Red while both look for Deni; Red asks Kofi to tell him to break a leg. Deni starts the festival late and performs a song dedicated to Zoila and Mapi ("Saturday"). Kofi spots a masked gunman just before he opens fire on the stage. Deni escapes into an alleyway, but the gunman finds and assassinates him.

Red is pleased, but then he discovers that all of his employees have left work to attend a joyous blue-themed memorial for Deni ("Die with You"); Kofi tells Red that they all finally "got their day". In an epilogue, Kofi starts telling her child a story about how dreams come true.

Cast
 Donald Glover as Deni Maroon, a Cuban musician who "is determined to throw a festival for his island community"
 Rihanna as Kofi Novia, Deni's girlfriend and musical inspiration
 Letitia Wright as Yara Love
 Nonso Anozie as Red, "a shady island tycoon" whose business interests conflict with Deni's festival
 Betiza Bistmark Calderón as Emani Dune
 Yansel Alberto Monagas Pérez as Coley
 Ayensi Amilgar Jardines Delgado as Dodo
 Karla Talía Pino Piloto as Zoila
 Alain Jonathan Amat Rodriguez as Mapi

Production
In August 2018, it had been reported that actors and musicians Donald Glover and Rihanna had been filming a secret project in Cuba titled Guava Island throughout that summer. Glover's Atlanta collaborator Hiro Murai was directing, with Letitia Wright and Nonso Anozie also involved.

Music
The film's score was composed by Michael Uzowuru, with its soundtrack also including several songs performed by Glover as Childish Gambino:

Release
The trailer for the full-length movie premiered on November 24, 2018, at the PHAROS festival in New Zealand. The footage featured Glover singing and strumming a guitar while in the presence of Rihanna, who plays his girlfriend on screen.

On April 5, 2019, advertisements for Guava Island appeared on Spotify indicating something happening on "Saturday Night | April 13". The film debuted at Coachella on April 11, 2019. That same weekend, Glover performed at the Coachella Valley Music and Arts Festival. The 30-second advertisement features Glover singing, and ending with "I'll see you at the show, everyone". Clicking the advertisement leads to the Rap Caviar playlist curated by Spotify, which was "presented by Guava Island" for Spotify users. It was later revealed Amazon Studios would distribute the film, and Regency Enterprises had financed the film, with it being released on April 13.

Reception
The website's critics consensus reads: "Thematically ambitious if occasionally somewhat obtuse, Guava Island adds another intriguing chapter to a talented team's burgeoning filmography." On Metacritic, it has a weighted average score of 64 out of 100, based on eight reviews, indicating "generally favorable" reviews. It received a nomination for the Critics' Choice Television Award for Best Movie Made for Television.

Peter Debruge of Variety magazine writes "the film serves as a shorter, tighter Purple Rain, a self-mythologizing origin story from the artist formerly known as Childish Gambino, reintroduced here as Deni Maroon." Debruge expresses disappointment that film features less music than expected and that Rihanna does not sing. He praises the film as it "Plugs squarely into the zeitgeist, answering conflict with a call for love."
Joelle Monique of The A.V. Club gave the film a C+, summing up her review: "Short, sweet, and to the point Guava Island proves a catchy little musical number."

In Rolling Stone, Guava Island screenwriter Stephen Glover, Donald's brother, notes a relationship of the plot and themes to the life and recent death of American rapper Nipsey Hussle. He also discusses the "idea of capitalism in America and how it’s left people out over the years. But at the same time, it has the power to empower you if you can wield it. The idea of capitalism and the relation that black people especially have to capitalism is something that's interesting to us."

See also
List of black films of the 2010s

References

External links
 

2010s musical films
Amazon Studios films
American musical films
Films about music festivals
Films directed by Hiro Murai
Films shot in Cuba
Films set on islands
Regency Enterprises films
Amazon Prime Video original films
2010s English-language films
2010s American films
2019 directorial debut films